Cueva del Indio (Spanish for "cave of the Indian") is a seaside cave located along limestone cliffs in Islote, Arecibo along Puerto Rico's Atlantic coast. The cave and its surroundings are protected by the Puerto Rico Department of Natural and Environmental Resources (DRNA) as the Cueva del Indio Nature Reserve. The cave gets its name after the numerous petroglyphs created by the Taínos.

Ecology 

The marine areas off Cueva del Indio are also protected as part of Cueva del Indio Nature Reserve, particularly the turtlegrass (Thalassia testudinum) meadows which is important for the West Indian manatee and numerous other animal species.

References 

Caves of Puerto Rico
Arecibo, Puerto Rico
Limestone caves
Petroglyphs in Puerto Rico
Nature reserves
Protected areas of Puerto Rico